Philippe Gagnon (born January 20, 1980) is a Canadian retired Paralympic swimmer and politician. Gagnon ran as a Conservative in the riding of Jonquière in the 2019 federal election.

Swimming career
A native of Chicoutimi, Quebec, Gagnon was born with clubfeet. He first competed for Canada at the 2000 Summer Paralympics in Sydney, where he won gold in the 100 metre freestyle S10 in a world record time of 54.30, gold in the 400 metre freestyle S10 in a Paralympic record time of 4:11.44, and silver in the 100 metre butterfly S10 in 1:00.25. In the relays, Gagnon, along with Benoît Huot, Adam Purdy, and Andrew Haley, won gold in the 4×100 metre medley 34pts in a world record time of 4:32.39, and with Haley, Purdy, and Brad Sales finished 4th in the 4×100 metre freestyle 34pts in 4:14.69.

At the 2002 Commonwealth Games in Manchester, Gagnon won silver in the 50 metre EAD freestyle. Competing against swimmers in other classifications, Gagnon covered the distance in 25.04, equaling the world record. In the 100 metre EAD freestyle, Gagnon finished 5th in 54.65.

Politics 
Gagnon ran for a seat in the House of Commons of Canada for the Conservative Party in the riding of Jonquière in the 2019 federal election.

Electoral record

References

External links 
 
 
Swimming for Canada | The Candidates; promotional video produced by the Conservative Party of Canada on YouTube

1980 births
Living people
Amputee category Paralympic competitors
Canadian male butterfly swimmers
Canadian male freestyle swimmers
Canadian sportsperson-politicians
Canadian amputees
Commonwealth Games medallists in swimming
Commonwealth Games silver medallists for Canada
Medalists at the 2000 Summer Paralympics
Paralympic gold medalists for Canada
Paralympic medalists in swimming
Paralympic silver medalists for Canada
Paralympic swimmers of Canada
Sportspeople from Saguenay, Quebec
Swimmers at the 2000 Summer Paralympics
Swimmers at the 2002 Commonwealth Games
S10-classified Paralympic swimmers
21st-century Canadian people
Medallists at the 2002 Commonwealth Games